Premature may refer to:

 Premature (2014 film), an American comedy film
 Premature (2019 film), an American romantic drama film
 PREMature, a 2015 British television drama miniseries

See also
 Premature aging, of an organism
 Premature birth, a preterm baby birth
 Premature ejaculation, a condition in which a man ejaculates earlier than he or his partner would like him to
 Adult premature aging syndrome, a disease with the appearance of premature aging
 Premature Burial, a horror short story by American writer Edgar Allan Poe, published in 1844.